Thomas Fontaine (born 8 May 1991) is a professional footballer who plays as a defender for TFF First League club Gençlerbirliği. Born in the French region of Réunion, Fontaine represents the Madagascar national team internationally.

Club career
Fontaine made his professional debut on 30 July 2012, coming on as a substitute for Yacoub Meite in the 4–0 defeat to Monaco.

On 29 January 2022, Fontaine signed with Nancy.

After a brief spell with Beroe in Bulgaria, Fontaine joined TFF First League club Gençlerbirliği on a one-and-a-half-year deal on 10 January 2023.

International career
Fontaine represented the France U21 national team at the 2011 FIFA U-20 World Cup. Fontaine made his senior debut for  Madagascar in a 2019 Africa Cup of Nations qualification win over Sudan on 9 June 2017. He represented the national team at 2019 Africa Cup of Nations.

Career statistics

International

Honours
Lorient
 Ligue 2: 2020

Auxerre
 Coupe de France: runner-up: 2015

Orders
Knight Order of Madagascar: 2019

References

External links
 
 Thomas Fontaine profile at Foot-National.com
 
 

1991 births
Living people
People from Saint-Pierre, Réunion
People with acquired Malagasy citizenship
Malagasy footballers
Madagascar international footballers
French footballers
France youth international footballers
Footballers from Réunion
French sportspeople of Malagasy descent
French people of Réunionnais descent
People of Malagasy descent from Réunion
Association football defenders
2019 Africa Cup of Nations players
Olympique Lyonnais players
Tours FC players
AJ Auxerre players
Clermont Foot players
Stade de Reims players
FC Lorient players
AS Nancy Lorraine players
PFC Beroe Stara Zagora players
Gençlerbirliği S.K. footballers
Ligue 1 players
Ligue 2 players
Championnat National 2 players
First Professional Football League (Bulgaria) players
Expatriate footballers in Bulgaria
Expatriate footballers in Turkey
Recipients of orders, decorations, and medals of Madagascar